I Dreamed of Africa is a 2000 American biographical-drama film directed by Hugh Hudson, starring Kim Basinger. It also stars Vincent Perez, Eva Marie Saint, Garrett Strommen, Liam Aiken and Daniel Craig. It is based on the autobiographical novel I Dreamed of Africa by Kuki Gallmann, an Italian writer who moved to Kenya and became involved in conservation. It was screened in the Un Certain Regard section at the 2000 Cannes Film Festival. This film was both a commercial and critical failure.

Synopsis
In Italy 1972, Kuki Gallmann (Kim Basinger), a divorced Italian socialite, changes her life after surviving a car crash. She marries Paolo (Vincent Perez), a man she does not know well, and moves with him and her young son to Kenya, where they start a ranch. She faces many problems, both physical and emotional, that will test her.

Cast
 Kim Basinger as Kuki Gallmann
 Vincent Perez as Paolo Gallmann
 Eva Marie Saint as Franca
 Daniel Craig as Declan Fielding
 Liam Aiken and Garrett Strommen - Emanuele (age 7 and age 17)
 Lance Reddick as Simon
 Connie Chiume as Wanjiku
 Shannon Esra as Siri

Soundtrack
This includes "Voi che sapete", sung by Brigitte Fassbaender (mezzo-soprano), with the Vienna Philharmonic Orchestra, István Kertész conducting, from Act 2 of the opera Le nozze di Figaro (The Marriage of Figaro), K. 492, composed by Wolfgang Amadeus Mozart. This was one of the last films scored by acclaimed composer Maurice Jarre.

Reception
The film was not received well despite praise for Kim Basinger's performance. It has a 10% ranking on Rotten Tomatoes, based on 102 reviews. Basinger earned a Golden Raspberry Award nomination for Worst Actress (also for Bless the Child).

It was also a huge financial flop; its budget was $50 million, and the worldwide gross was less than $15 million.

References

External links
 
 
 
 
 
 I Dreamed of Africa at Rotten Tomatoes

2000 films
2000s adventure drama films
2000 biographical drama films
2000s romance films
American biographical drama films
American adventure drama films
Drama films based on actual events
2000s English-language films
Films about death
Films about families
Films about snakes
Films based on biographies
Films set in Kenya
Films shot in Italy
Films shot in Kenya
Films shot in South Africa
Films set in the 1970s
Films set in 1972
Films set in the 1980s
Films set in 1980
Films set in 1983
Films directed by Hugh Hudson
Films scored by Maurice Jarre
Columbia Pictures films
2000 drama films
Biographical films about writers
2000s American films